Solomon's Lodge may refer to:

 Solomon's Lodge, Savannah, the oldest Masonic Lodge in Georgia
 King Solomon's Lodge, the builders of the original Bunker Hill Monument
 Solomon's Lodge, Charleston, the oldest Masonic Lodge in South Carolina